Lelu may refer to:

Lelu, Kosrae, municipality of the state of Kosrae, Micronesia
Lelu Island, small island in Lelu municipality
Lelu Island (British Columbia), Canada
Lelu, Estonia, village in Käina Parish, Hiiu County, Estonia
Lelu (album), a 2015 album by Sanni

See also
Lele (disambiguation)